The spot-breasted thornbird (Phacellodomus maculipectus) is a species of bird in the family Furnariidae. It is found in the Southern Andean Yungas. Its natural habitats are subtropical or tropical dry forests and subtropical or tropical high-altitude shrubland.

References

spot-breasted thornbird
Birds of the Southern Andean Yungas
spot-breasted thornbird
Taxonomy articles created by Polbot